Asiabak-e Band (also Romanized as Āsīābak-e Band; also known as Āsīābak, Āsīāvak Band, Āsīyābak, and Āsyā Bak) is a village in Nur Ali Beyk Rural District, in the Central District of Saveh County, Markazi Province, Iran. At the 2006 census, its population was 412, in 103 families.

References 

Populated places in Saveh County